Chrystian Breslauer (born 12 January 1802 in Warsaw; died there 10 August 1882) was a Polish painter and art pedagogue.

Chrystian Breslauer studied in Berlin and Düsseldorf, where he was taught by Johann Wilhelm Schrirmer. He took numerous art travels around Germany, the Scandinavian countries, he was also in Italy. During his art travels, he was introduced to new painting types. From 1845, he lived permanently in Warsaw. He was a pedagogue at the School of Fine Arts (from the year of 1846), and held private art classes (between 1865 and 1868).

Selected paintings

References

External links

1802 births
1882 deaths
19th-century Polish painters
19th-century Polish male artists
Polish male painters